René Georges Drolet (born November 13, 1944) is a Canadian former professional ice hockey centre who played in two National Hockey League (NHL) games, one with the Philadelphia Flyers in 1972 and the other with the Detroit Red Wings in 1974. The rest of his career, which lasted from 1963 to 1978, was mainly spent in the American Hockey League.

Playing career
Drolet was one of the leading scorers in American Hockey League history, totalling 298 goals and 443 assists for 741 points in 840 games with the Quebec Aces, Richmond Robins, Virginia Wings and Rochester Americans. He registered 10 consecutive 20-goal seasons in the AHL and was the league's leading scorer during the 1970s.

Career statistics

Regular season and playoffs

External links
 

1944 births
Living people
Canadian ice hockey centres
Detroit Red Wings players
French Quebecers
Ice hockey people from Quebec City
Montreal Junior Canadiens players
Muskegon Mohawks players
Philadelphia Flyers players
Quebec Aces (AHL) players
Richmond Robins players
Rochester Americans players
Virginia Wings players